Pelagihabitans is a Gram-negative, strictly aerobic, rod-shaped, non-spore-forming and non-motile genus of bacteria from the family of Flavobacteriaceae with one known species (Pelagihabitans pacificus). Pelagihabitans pacificus has been isolated from a deep-sea seamount.

References

Flavobacteria
Bacteria genera
Monotypic bacteria genera
Taxa described in 2020